HMS Kipling (F91) was a K-class destroyer built for the Royal Navy during the 1930s.

Description
The K-class destroyers were repeats of the preceding J class, except that they were not fitted for minesweeping gear. They were powered by two Parsons geared steam turbines, each driving one propeller shaft, using steam provided by two Admiralty three-drum boilers. The ships' complement was 183 officers and men.

The ships were armed with six 4.7-inch (120 mm) Mark XII guns in twin mounts, two superfiring in front of the bridge and one aft of the superstructure. For anti-aircraft (AA) defence, they had one quadruple mount for 2-pounder "pom-pom" guns and two quadruple mounts for the 0.5 inch Vickers Mark III anti-aircraft machinegun. The K-class ships were fitted with two above-water quintuple mounts for  torpedoes. The ship was fitted with two depth charge throwers and one rack for 20 depth charges.

Construction and career
HMS Kipling, named after the author and poet Rudyard Kipling, was laid down by Yarrow, Scotstoun on 20 October 1937, launched on 19 January 1939, by Kipling's daughter, and commissioned on 12 December 1939. On 11 October 1940, Kipling, along with another six destroyers, escorted the battleship HMS Renown to bombard the French port of Cherbourg .  At dawn on the 23rd of 1941 HMS Kelly and HMS Kashmir were retiring at full speed round the west of Crete. After surviving two heavy air attacks they were overtaken at 7.55 a.m. by a formation of twenty-four dive-bombers. Both ships were quickly sunk, with a loss of 210 lives. Fortunately the destroyer Kipling was near by, and, despite continuous bombing, rescued from the sea 279 officers and men, including Lord Louis Mountbatten, while she herself remained unscathed. Next morning, while still fifty miles away from Alexandria, and crowded from stem to stern with men, she ran completely out of fuel, but was safely met and towed in. On 17 December 1941, she was lightly damaged by splinters from a 203 mm round from the Italian cruiser Gorizia during the First Battle of Sirte.  The British assessment concluded instead that Kipling was hit by near-misses from 305 mm shells fired by the battleships Andrea Doria and Giulio Cesare. Her wireless aerials were knocked down, her structure, hull and attached boats holed. One crewmember was killed in action. On 28 December 1941 Kipling sank the German submarine . Kipling was attacked by German Ju 88 bombers of Lehrgeschwader 1 north-west of Mersa Matruh in Egypt on 11 May 1942 and sunk by Joachim Helbig. 29 of her crew were killed and 221 men were rescued.

Notes

References
 Bragadin, Marc'Antonio: The Italian Navy in World War II, United States Naval Institute, Annapolis, 1957.

External links

 HMS Kipling (F91)
 HMS Kipling (F91) @ uboat.net
 IWM Interview with survivor Len Chivers
 IWM Interview with survivor Eric Clark
 IWM Interview with survivor John Bainbridge

 

J, K and N-class destroyers of the Royal Navy
1939 ships
World War II destroyers of the United Kingdom
World War II shipwrecks in the Mediterranean Sea
Destroyers sunk by aircraft
Maritime incidents in May 1942
Ships sunk by German aircraft